Blue Maqams is an album by oud player and composer Anouar Brahem recorded in New York in 2017 and released on the ECM label.

Reception

The album received wide acclaim around the world. In DownBeat Bobby Reed wrote "The result is a program that features traditional music from Arab culture as well as more modern jazz elements. The word "maqam" refers here to Arabic melodic art, but also to Iraqi maqam, as practiced by master oud player Munir Bashir.  Each musician shines here". On Allmusic, Thom Jurek observed "Blue Maqams is lovely. It's a nearly perfect illustration of balance between cultural and musical inquiry, underscored by the confidence and near symbiotic communication of this gifted ensemble. This is an exceptional outing, even for an artist as accomplished and creative as Brahem". Writing for The Guardian reviewer John Fordham stated "Brahem’s oud often sketches in the themes, sometimes shadowed by the others in dreamy twilight reflections, more often accelerating into languidly swaying nightwalks such as the title track. Spanish-tinged guitar-like jams end in drum flurries, while thumping Holland bass vamps release scintillating jazz breakouts ... It’s a real meeting of hearts and minds". Writing for All About Jazz, Mark Sullivan noted "This is the closest thing to a jazz recording Brahem has made—but it is still completely his own vision, aided by an exceptionally sympathetic group of players". RTÉ reviewer Paddy Kehoe called it "Entrancing, essential stuff" declaring "Tunisian oud master Anouar Brahem marries the resonant stringed instrument of that name skilfully and intuitively in a glorious collaboration with the work of bassist Dave Holland, drummer Jack DeJohnette and pianist Django Bates on Blue Maqams. Shifting and rolling along in the seductive current, the original native Maghreb thread is never lost in the tentatively subtle explorations at play on this album". Financial Times' writer David Honigmann said it was "Brahem’s best set since Le Pas du Chat Noir".

Track listing
All compositions by Anouar Brahem
 "Opening Day" – 7:01
 "La Nuit" – 10:28
 "Blue Maqams" – 8:41
 "Bahia" – 8:45
 "La Passante" – 4:05
 "Bom Dia Rio" – 9:23
 "Persepolis's Mirage" – 8:06
 "The Recovered Road to Al-Sham" – 9:26
 "Unexpected Outcome" – 10:59

Personnel
 Anouar Brahem - oud
 Django Bates – piano
 Dave Holland - bass
 Jack DeJohnette - drums

References

ECM Records albums
Anouar Brahem albums
2017 albums
Albums produced by Manfred Eicher